Timo André Bakken (born 21 March 1989) is a Norwegian cross-country skier.

Career
He won a silver medal in the sprint race at the 2009 Junior World Ski Championships. He made his World Cup debut in March 2008 in Drammen, and collected his first World Cup points in March 2009 in Trondheim. A 27th place in November 2009 in Kuusamo followed.

He represents the sports club Mjøndalen IF, and lives in Skotselv.

In 2012  Bakken become the world fastest skier in 100m. He beat skiers like Petter Northug and Emil Jönsson. However, in 2013 Ludvig Søgnen Jensen beat his record.

Cross-country skiing results
All results are sourced from the International Ski Federation (FIS).

World Cup

Season standings

Individual podiums
 1 podium – (1 )

References

1989 births
Living people
Norwegian male cross-country skiers
People from Buskerud
Sportspeople from Viken (county)